The 2006 Hungarian Figure Skating Championships took place between December 16 and 17, 2005 in Budapest. Skaters competed in the disciplines of men's singles, ladies' singles, and ice dancing on the senior level. The results were used to choose the Hungarian teams to the 2006 Winter Olympics, the 2006 World Championships, and the 2006 European Championships.

Results

Men

Ladies

Ice dancing

External links
 results

Hungarian Figure Skating Championships
2005 in figure skating
Hungarian Figure Skating Championships, 2006
Figure skating